The 2016 Basildon Borough Council election took place on 5 May 2016 to elect members of Basildon Borough Council in Essex. This was on the same day as other local elections.

Results Summary

All comparisons in vote share are to the corresponding 2012 election.

Ward Results

Billericay East

Billericay West

Burstead

Crouch

Fryerns

Laindon Park

Langdon Hills

Lee Chapel North

Nethermayne

Pitsea North West

Pitsea South East

St. Martin's

Vange

Wickford North

References

2016 English local elections
2016
2010s in Essex